Lies and Deceit is a Spanish thriller drama television series consisting of a remake of the British series Liar. The series stars Ángela Cremonte and Javier Rey. It aired in 2020 on Atresplayer Premium.

Premise 
Set in the island of Mallorca, the plot follows Laura Munar (Ángela Cremonte), a high school literature teacher who has dinner with Xavier Vera (Javier Rey), a noted surgeon. She wakes up unwell the morning after, suspecting she had been drugged and raped.

Cast

Production and release 
Produced by Atresmedia Studios, Mentiras is an adaptation of the British series Liar, created by Harry and Jack Williams for ITV and Sundance TV. The shooting started by November 2019 and it took place in between Madrid and Mallorca, the series consists of six 50-minute long episodes. Marina Velázquez, Javier San Román, Tatiana Rodríguez and Camino López were charged with the adapted screenplay whereas Norberto López Amado and Curro Novallas directed the episodes. The series premiered on Atresplayer Premium on 19 April 2020, ending its broadcasting run on 24 May 2020. The series began a free-to-air run on Antena 3 on 12 January 2022.

References 

2020 Spanish television series debuts
2020 Spanish television series endings
2020s Spanish drama television series
Spanish thriller television series
Television shows set in the Balearic Islands
Television shows filmed in Spain
Spanish television series based on British television series
2020s mystery television series
Spanish mystery television series
Rape in television
Spanish-language television shows
Atresplayer Premium original programming